"Hanging on the Old Barbed Wire" (Roud 9618) is a British war song of World War I.  The song sarcastically recounts the location of various army members, not to be found in the combat zone, and concludes by describing the location of the old battalion: "hanging on the old barbed wire". A barbed wire fence separated the front-line trench from no man's land, and men brave or unfortunate enough to go over the top of the dug-out were often quickly shot and their bodies caught in the barbed wire. This troop song was not popular with officers, who thought it bad for morale, though attempts to suppress it were unsuccessful.

Lyrics
There are several different versions of this song, though all share the final two lines. One version:

A variant last line is "if you want to find the privates".

Another variation fourth verse sees C.O replaced with colonel, put at the start and, "He's On another 7 days leave".

Covers
The song was included on the 1988 album English Rebel Songs 1381–1914 by the English anarchist punk band Chumbawamba, as well as on their 2003 re-recording of the same album (English Rebel Songs 1381–1984).

A shortened version of the song was also included on the 2018 album The Blind Leading the Blind by the Ukrainian metal band 1914 as an interlude. The band's songs are all related to WWI events.

The song was covered by death industrial band Maruta Kommand on their 2000 album "Holocaust Rites".

The song is part of the "Great War Trilogy" (The Valley of the Shadow / The Old Barbed Wire / Long, Long Trail) sung by John Roberts and Tony Barrand in their album,   A Present from the Gentlemen: A Pandora's Box of English Folk Songs (Golden Hind Music, GHM-101, 1992).

References

British songs
Songs about soldiers
Songs about military officers
Songs about death
Songs of World War I
Anti-war songs